Balaji Venugopal is an Indian actor, who has worked in Tamil films. Beginning his career as a radio host, Balaji appeared in films including Poisollaporom, Madrasapattinam (2010) and Nanban (2012), before playing a leading role in the noir comedy Sutta Kadhai (2013).

Career
After beginning his career as a radio jockey in Radio Mirchi, He is currently working as a prime time radiokey in Hello FM. Balaji became a television presenter for Vijay TV hosting a show Vasool Rani, he then went on to host Raagamaalika on Jaya TV. He made his acting debut with Poi Solla Porom (2008) and then appeared in films including Madrasapattinam (2010), Nanban and Kadhalil Sodhappuvadhu Yeppadi (2012), before playing a leading role in the noir comedy Sutta Kadhai (2013). He has played the antagonist role in Naaigal Jaakirathai (2015).

In 2015, Venugopal became the creative head of a new YouTube channel called Madras Meter, which features several comedy skit videos in Tamil and has attracted over 250,000 subscribers.

Filmography

References

External links 

Year of birth missing (living people)
Living people
Male actors in Tamil cinema
Indian male film actors
21st-century Indian male actors